Wugong railway station is a station on the  Longhai railway in Wugong County, Xianyang, Shaanxi.

History
The station was opened in 1936.

Formerly known as Pujizhen railway station, the station was renamed to its current name in 1982.

References

Railway stations in Shaanxi
Stations on the Longhai Railway
Railway stations in China opened in 1936